Xanthine ( or ; archaically xanthic acid; systematic name 3,7-dihydropurine-2,6-dione) is a purine base found in most human body tissues and fluids, as well as in other organisms. Several stimulants are derived from xanthine, including caffeine, theophylline, and theobromine.

Xanthine is a product on the pathway of purine degradation.
 It is created from guanine by guanine deaminase.
 It is created from hypoxanthine by xanthine oxidoreductase.
 It is also created from xanthosine by purine nucleoside phosphorylase.

Xanthine is subsequently converted to uric acid by the action of the xanthine oxidase enzyme.

Use and manufacturing
Xanthine is used as a drug precursor for human and animal medications, and is manufactured as a pesticide ingredient.

Clinical significance
Derivatives of xanthine (known collectively as xanthines) are a group of alkaloids commonly used for their effects as mild stimulants and as bronchodilators, notably in the treatment of asthma or influenza symptoms. In contrast to other, more potent stimulants like sympathomimetic amines, xanthines mainly act to oppose the actions of adenosine, and increase alertness in the central nervous system.

Toxicity
Methylxanthines (methylated xanthines), which include caffeine, aminophylline, IBMX, paraxanthine, pentoxifylline, theobromine, theophylline, and 7-methylxanthine (heteroxanthine), among others, affect the airways, increase heart rate and force of contraction, and at high concentrations can cause cardiac arrhythmias. In high doses, they can lead to convulsions that are resistant to anticonvulsants.  Methylxanthines induce gastric acid and pepsin secretions in the gastrointestinal tract.  Methylxanthines are metabolized by cytochrome P450 in the liver.

If swallowed, inhaled, or exposed to the eyes in high amounts, xanthines can be harmful, and may cause an allergic reaction if applied topically.

Pharmacology
In in vitro pharmacological studies, xanthines act as both:
 competitive nonselective phosphodiesterase inhibitors which raise intracellular cAMP, activate PKA, inhibit TNF-α and leukotriene synthesis, and reduce inflammation and innate immunity and
 nonselective adenosine receptor antagonists  which inhibit sleepiness-inducing adenosine.

However, different analogues show varying potency at the numerous subtypes, and a wide range of synthetic xanthines (some nonmethylated) have been developed searching for compounds with greater selectivity for phosphodiesterase enzyme or adenosine receptor subtypes.

Pathology
People with rare genetic disorders, specifically xanthinuria and Lesch–Nyhan syndrome, lack sufficient xanthine oxidase and cannot convert xanthine to uric acid.

Possible formation in absence of life

Studies reported in 2008, based on 12C/13C isotopic ratios of organic compounds found in the Murchison meteorite, suggested that xanthine and related chemicals, including the RNA component uracil, have been formed extraterrestrially. In August 2011, a report, based on NASA studies with meteorites found on Earth, was published suggesting xanthine and related organic molecules, including the DNA and RNA components adenine and guanine, were found in outer space.

See also 
 DMPX
 Murchison meteorite
 Theobromine poisoning
 Xanthene
 Xanthone
 Xanthydrol

References

 
Enones